Jean Carlos López Moscoso (born 9 November 1993) is a Dominican footballer who plays as a midfielder for Cibao FC and the Dominican Republic national team.

He made an unofficial debut for the Dominican Republic in August 2013 versus Costa Rica in a friendly, which was not recognized on FIFA calendar. His first FIFA recognized match with the Dominican Republic came the following year, on 30 August 2014, against El Salvador.

In 2015, López was the only player from the 2015 MLS Caribbean Combine to be selected for the 2015 MLS SuperDraft.

International career

International goals
Scores and results list Dominican Republic's goal tally first.

References

External links

1993 births
Living people
Dominican Republic footballers
Dominican Republic international footballers
Association football midfielders
Liga Dominicana de Fútbol players
Moca FC players
Atlético Pantoja players